Xenocs is a company providing instruments, software and related services for x-ray characterization of materials, in particular Small Angle X-ray Scattering (SAXS) and Wide Angle X-ray Scattering (WAXS).

Xenocs products are typically used by universities, research institutes and corporate labs in projects focused on research, development and process optimization of a wide range of new materials. Application segments range from nanomaterials, polymers, food, consumer care, energy to biomaterials and pharmaceuticals.

As of September 2020, the Xenocs group reported 75 employees.

History 
Xenocs was founded in 2000 as a spin-off from Institut Laue Langevin in Grenoble, France, by Ian Anderson, Frédéric Bossan and Peter Høghøj, the latter two forming the management team.

In 2001 the company moved to nearby Sassenage and set up facilities for production of X-ray, EUV and neutron optics. In 2002 it launched the FOX2D line of single reflection multilayer coated x-ray optics, followed in 2006 by the GeniX micro-focus x-ray source and the FOX3D aspheric multilayer coated x-ray optics building on a range of patents. In 2008 it launched products for (virtually) scatterless x-ray collimation, allowing for increased performance of SAXS equipment, leading to the launch of the Xeuss SAXS instrument product-line in 2010.

In 2014, Xenocs launched the Nano-inXider compact SAXS equipment at the IUCr conference in collaboration with CEA and Arkema. The same year was also the International Year of Crystallography and Xenocs co-organized the IUCr-UNESCO Open Factory held in December.

At the end of 2016, Xenocs acquired SAXSLAB with offices near Copenhagen, Denmark and Amherst, MA, USA. Xenocs combined their own Xeuss product line with the newly acquired SAXSLAB product lines and developed the Xeuss 3.0 SAXS/WAXS beamline and Xenocs XSACT software for data reduction and analysis.

Geographical 
Xenocs is considered as one of the major manufacturers in the SAXS market.  Its headquarters are in Grenoble, France.

References

External links 
 Official website

X-ray crystallography
X-ray equipment manufacturers
Privately held companies of France
French companies established in 2000